Family Ties is an American sitcom television series that aired on NBC for seven seasons, premiering on September 22, 1982, and concluding on May 14, 1989. The series, created by Gary David Goldberg, reflected the move in the United States from the cultural liberalism of the 1960s and 1970s to the conservatism of the 1980s. This culture was particularly expressed through the relationship between young Republican Alex P. Keaton (portrayed by Michael J. Fox) and his ex-hippie parents, Steven and Elyse Keaton (portrayed by Michael Gross and Meredith Baxter-Birney).

The show won multiple awards, including three consecutive Emmy Awards for Michael J. Fox as Outstanding Lead Actor in a Comedy Series.

Plot
Set in suburban Columbus, Ohio during the Reagan administration, the show depicts Steven and Elyse Keaton (Michael Gross and Meredith Baxter) as baby boomers, liberals and former hippies, raising their three children: ambitious, would-be millionaire entrepreneur Alex (Michael J. Fox); fashion-conscious, gossipy Mallory (Justine Bateman); and tomboy Jennifer (Tina Yothers). Married in 1964, Elyse is an independent architect and Steven, a native of Buffalo, New York, is the station manager of WKS, a local public television station.

Much of the humor of the series focuses on the cultural divide during the 1980s when younger generations rejected the counterculture of the 1960s and embraced the materialism and conservative politics which came to define the 1980s. Alex, the eldest, is a Young Republican who embraces Reaganomics and exhibits conservative attitudes. In contrast to her feminist mother, Mallory is an apolitical and materialistic young woman presented as a vacuous airhead, fodder for jokes and teasing from her brother. Jennifer, an athletic tomboy and the second youngest child, shares more of the values of her parents and just wants to be a normal kid. Steven and Elyse have a fourth child, Andrew, who is born in early 1985. Alex dotes on his young brother and molds Andy in his conservative image.

Regarding the concept, show creator Goldberg observed, "It really was just an observation of what was going on in my own life with my own friends. We were these old kind of radical people and all of a sudden you're in the mainstream ... but now you've got these kids and you've empowered them, and they're super intelligent, and they're definitely to the right of where you are. They don't understand what's wrong with having money and moving forward." A recurring theme involved Alex hatching a scheme involving some amount of greedy money-making, which led to a humorous misadventure and ended with Alex being forced to apologize for his choices. According to Goldberg, "We actually had this structure that we'd inherited from Jim Brooks and Allan [Burns], which was six scenes and a tag ... And then the last scene became Alex apologizes, in every show, we just left it up. Alex apologizes. Some version of it." Nevertheless, Fox's portrayal of a likeable Alex proved to be an important part of the show's success. Goldberg again stated, "With Alex, I did not think I was creating a sympathetic character. Those were not traits that I aspired to and didn't want my kids to aspire to, actually ... But at the end of Family Ties, when we went off the air, then The New York Times had done a piece and they said, 'Greed with the face of an angel.' And I think that's true ... [Michael J. Fox] would make things work, and the audience would simply not access the darker side of what he's actually saying."

Cast

Main cast
 Meredith Baxter-Birney as Elyse Donnelly Keaton: Steven's wife and the mother of Alex, Mallory, Jennifer, and Andy. She is a successful architect and an ex-hippie liberal who lived in California in the 1960s. She is a patient, caring, and loving wife and mother. She met Steven in college where they later married. 
 Michael Gross as Steven Keaton: Elyse's husband and father to Alex, Mallory, Jennifer, and Andy. He is a branch manager of the local PBS station, [the fictional] WKS, who is an ex-hippie liberal who lived in California in the 1960s. He can be argumentative at times, but in the end is a diligent and supportive father who cares about his family deeply. He met and married Elyse in college in Berkeley. 
 Michael J. Fox as Alex P. Keaton: the eldest child and elder son of Steven and Elyse, and brother to Mallory, Jennifer, and Andy. He is an intelligent and ambitious Young Republican with two goals in life: to be successful and make money. He goes on to attend Leland University, and has long-term relationships with two women: Ellen Reed and Lauren Miller. He often clashes with his parents about their liberal politics, which conflict with his own conservative views.  
 Justine Bateman as Mallory Keaton: the second-eldest child and elder daughter of Steven and Elyse, and sister to Alex, Jennifer, and Andy. She is an unscholarly material girl, but kind-hearted and inoffensive, whose main interests are shopping and boys. She has a longtime relationship with Nick Moore. In the episode "Designated Hitter," it is revealed that Mallory has a higher I.Q. than scholastic overachiever Alex. 
 Tina Yothers as Jennifer Keaton: the second-youngest child and younger daughter of Elyse and Steven, and sister to Alex, Mallory, and Andy. She is a tomboy whose cares mostly include athletics. She skews more closely to her parents' liberal views, in contrast to her siblings’ more conservative views. She is shown to be aggressive but sweet. She is shown to be jealous at first of Andy, but later cares for him. 
 Brian Bonsall as Andrew "Andy" Keaton (seasons 5–7)
Garrett and Tyler Merriman as Baby Andrew "Andy" Keaton (season 4): the youngest child and younger son of Elyse and Steven, and brother to Alex, Mallory, and Jennifer. He is born during season 3, coinciding with Meredith Baxter-Birney's real-life pregnancy. After he is born, the whole family quickly shows affection and a loving attitude towards him—especially Alex, who attempts to imbue him with conservative values. He quickly ages by about four years between seasons 4 and 5.

Recurring cast
 Marc Price as Irwin "Skippy" Handelman
 Scott Valentine as Nick Moore (seasons 4–7)
 Tracy Pollan as Ellen Reed (season 4)
 Courteney Cox as Lauren Miller (seasons 6–7)

Notable guest stars
 River Phoenix as Eugene Forbes in the episode "My Tutor"
 Jeff Cohen as Marv Jr./Dougie Barker  in 2 episodes
 Corey Feldman as Student Walter in the episode "The Disciple"
 Tom Hanks as Ned Donnelly in 3 episodes
 Martha Plimpton as Jessie Black in the episode "You've Got a Friend"
 Wil Wheaton as Timothy Higgins in the episode "'D' Is for Date" 
 David Faustino as Keith Baily in the episode "To Snatch a Keith"
 Geena Davis as Karen Nicholson in	2 episodes
 Maura Tierney as Darlene in the episode "My Best Friend's Girl"
 Crispin Glover as Doug in the episode "The Birthday Boy"
 Christina Applegate as Kitten in the episode "Band on the Run"
 Julia Louis-Dreyfus as Susan in the episode "Read It and Weep: Part 2"
 Brownie McGhee as Eddie Dupree in the episode "The Blues Brother"

The show had been sold to the network using the pitch "hip parents, square kids." Originally, Elyse and Steven were intended to be the main characters. However, the audience reacted so positively to Alex during the taping of the fourth episode that he became the focus on the show. Fox had received the role after Matthew Broderick turned it down. Laura Dern was considered for the role of Mallory Keaton. Ed O'Neill auditioned for Steven Keaton. but he later turned it down as he felt he wasn’t right for the part.

Supporting cast and characters include neighbor Irwin "Skippy" Handelman (Marc Price), who has an eternal crush on Mallory; Nick Moore (Scott Valentine), Mallory's Sylvester Stallone-esque artist boyfriend; Lauren Miller (Courteney Cox); and Alex's feminist, artist girlfriend Ellen Reed (Tracy Pollan, whom Michael J. Fox later married, in 1988). In season 3, episode 17, Elyse gave birth to her fourth child, Andrew (who was played by Brian Bonsall from season 5 onward). Twins Garrett and Tyler Merriman played baby Andrew.

Production
Main stars Meredith Baxter and Michael Gross are exactly the same age, sharing the same birthday on June 21, 1947. In the series, their characters were intended to be approximately five or six years older, given that their on-screen son, played by Michael J. Fox, was in fact only fourteen years younger than Baxter and Gross in real life.

The show had several similarities or parallels to Baxter's prior series, Family. In addition to similar names for both series, the shows both initially featured three children, the youngest a tomboy, and later added another child to the cast. Baxter played the eldest child on the earlier show, and assumed the role of mother in Family Ties.

Theme song
The theme song "Without Us" (credited in season one as "Us") was composed by Jeff Barry and Tom Scott in 1982. During the first ten episodes of the first season it was performed by Dennis Tufano and Mindy Sterling. From episode 11 onward the song was performed by Johnny Mathis and Deniece Williams, as producers were displeased with Tufano's and Sterling's version. A full-length version of "Without Us" is featured on Mathis and Williams' duet album "That's What Friends Are For," released by Columbia Records on the 2003 CD release of the album.

"At This Moment"

"At This Moment" was a 1981 single written by songwriter and recording artist Billy Vera and recorded live by Vera and his band, Billy Vera & The Beaters. Five years after its original release, a studio recording of "At This Moment" was featured at the beginning of several episodes of the fourth and early fifth seasons as the love song associated with Alex P. Keaton (Michael J. Fox) and his girlfriend Ellen Reed (Tracy Pollan). Its exposure on Family Ties renewed a huge interest in the song. People called and wrote NBC asking for the name of the song and its singer. The tune then began a revived chart run, eventually hitting #1 on both the Billboard Hot 100 and Adult Contemporary charts in January 1987. It also hit the Billboard R&B Chart and the Billboard Hot Country Chart. "At This Moment" quickly sold over a million copies in the United States, becoming one of the last Gold-certified singles in the 45 RPM format. The song crossed over to the R&B and Country formats, reaching #42 Country; as country was moving away from pop influence at the time, "At This Moment" would be the last song to appear on the country charts and reach number one on the pop charts for 13 years.

The first Billy Vera & The Beaters album was recorded live, so when "At This Moment" was used in Family Ties, only the live version existed. Vera later explained: "We re-recorded pieces of the song. In other words, they'd need 12 seconds here, or 20 seconds there in the show. So we went in and recorded just those pieces in the studio without the audience, because the audience would have been annoying, to the TV viewer. The thing that made it work better the second time was that the story of the song, boy-loses-girl, was the story of the episode "Boy Loses Girl." The first time they used the song, it was when he met the girl."

Family Ties writer Michael Weithorn would later recall: "In 1985, I had written an episode of Family Ties to start the fourth season, and we needed a sort of a sad romantic song. I just happened to go into a bar in Los Angeles and saw Billy and the Beaters. That was the perfect song, and the rest was history." In an interview, Vera talked about his meeting with Family Ties writer Michael Weithorn: "One afternoon I got a phone call, and this guy said, 'Hey I produce a show called Family Ties, and some of us were at your show the other night, and we heard you do this song that we thought would be perfect for an episode that we have coming up.' I got my publisher to make a deal for that with them and America responded like crazy." "NBC called us up, they said, 'My God, we've never had any response like this in the history of the network for a song. The switchboards are lighting up, we're getting letters, telegrams, where can we find this song?' People started calling radio stations, which never happens. I mean, it was a total organic hit."

On the DVD releases of both Family Ties''' fourth and fifth seasons, "At This Moment" is still included and heard in those episodes.

In an interview with Rachael Ray in 2007, Michael J. Fox good-naturedly said, "Tracy and I couldn't get on the dance floor anywhere in the world for like ten years without them playing 'What did you think..."

At the 2011 TV Land Awards held in New York City, Billy Vera performed "At This Moment" with the main Family Ties cast in attendance that also included Michael J. Fox and Tracy Pollan, as the show had been nominated for and won Outstanding Fan Favorite.

Connection to Day by Day
During its final two seasons, Family Ties was scheduled on Sunday nights, often followed by Day by Day, another series from Ubu Productions. Michael Gross and Brian Bonsall brought their respective roles of Steven and Andy Keaton to the Day by Day episode "Trading Places," which reveals that Steven went to college with Brian Harper (Doug Sheehan).  This episode is included on a bonus special-features disc in the Family Ties: The Complete Series Deluxe Family Album Collection Edition Box Set DVD.

Other appearances
Some characters were featured on Mickey's 60th Birthday, broadcast on November 13, 1988, on NBC, and featured Justine Bateman, Tina Yothers, and Brian Bonsall as their Family Ties characters, trying to help Mickey Mouse when everybody fails to recognize him due to a spell. Michael J. Fox additionally had a cameo in a flashback using archive footage.

Episodes

Awards

Emmy Awards
 1986: Outstanding Lead Actor in a Comedy Series (Michael J. Fox)
 1987: Outstanding Lead Actor in a Comedy Series (Michael J. Fox)
 1987: Outstanding Writing in a Comedy Series
 1987: Outstanding Technical Direction
 1988: Outstanding Lead Actor in a Comedy Series (Michael J. Fox)

Golden Globes
 1989: Best Performance by an Actor in a TV-Series (Michael J. Fox)

TV Land Awards
 2008: Character You'd Pay to Do Your Homework for You (Michael J. Fox)
 2011: Fan Favorite, Presented by Ben Stiller to the Family Ties cast

Young Artist Awards
1985: Best Young Actress in a Television Comedy Series (Justine Bateman)
1985: Best Young Supporting Actress in a Television Comedy Series (Tina Yothers)
1986: Best Young Actor Starring in a Television Series (Marc Price)
1988: Best Young Actor Under Nine Years of Age (Brian Bonsall)
1989: Best Young Actor Under Ten Years of Age in Television or Motion Pictures (Brian Bonsall)

Syndication and international broadcast
NBC aired reruns of Family Ties weekday mornings from December 1985 until January 1987 before it was replaced by the Bill Rafferty version of Blockbusters. In the fall of 1987, the series went into syndication in the United States. Currently, reruns air on Antenna TV, Rewind TV and Pluto TV. Reruns previously aired on FamilyNet, TBS, Nick at Nite, TV Land, Hallmark Channel, The Hub and Pop.

In Canada, reruns of Family Ties began airing on CTS, a Christian-based network, on September 6, 2010. On May 15, 2011, Netflix began to stream season 1–7 on its "watch instantly" streaming service.

In Australia, Family Ties originally screened on the Seven Network from 1983 onwards. It became a perennial favourite repeated many times before being bought by the Nine Network which screened it up until 2008. It later screened on pay TV network TV1 before airing on 10 Peach (then known as Eleven) in the afternoons and late night until June 2013. As of June 2020, two episodes are shown on Saturday afternoons between 1 PM and 2 PM.

In the UK, Family Ties aired on Channel 4 from July 1985.

In Indonesia, Family Ties aired on RCTI and SCTV between 1990 and 1993.

In Italy, the show aired on Italia 1 under the name of Casa Keaton (Keaton House) from 1986 until 1992.

In the Philippines, the show aired on GMA Network and was simulcast on RPN-9 IBC-13 PTV-4 & ABS-CBN in 1983–1991. It moved to ABC-5 Pilipino and was dubbed in 1998–2000.

The show screened in New Zealand on TVNZ in the 80s and early 90s, but has never been repeated.

Home media

DVD
CBS DVD (distributed by Paramount) has released all seven seasons of Family Ties on DVD in Region 1, . The second through fifth season releases contain special features, gag reels and episodic promos. The second season contains interviews with Michael Gross and Michael J. Fox along with other cast members. The fourth season contains the made-for-TV-movie, Family Ties Vacation. Paramount has also released the first three seasons on DVD in Region 4.

On November 5, 2013, CBS Home Entertainment released Family Ties - The Complete Series on DVD in Region 1.

On November 11, 2014, CBS Home Entertainment re-released a repackaged version of the complete series set, at a lower price, but did not include the bonus disc that was part of the original complete series set.

In Australia, Region 4, after the first 3 seasons were released, no further release came to light. In 2016, Via Vision Entertainment obtained the rights to the series and re-released the first three seasons along with season four on July 6, 2016. The remaining seasons were released each month after including a Complete Series boxset.

Digital format
In addition to DVD, the TV series is available through a variety of services such as Prime Video and Vudu in the digital format.

References in other media
Over a decade after the end of Family Ties, Michael J. Fox's final episodes on Spin City featured numerous allusions to the show. In these episodes, Michael Gross played a therapist for Fox's character Michael Patrick Flaherty and the episode contained a reference to an off-screen character named "Mallory". In the episode, after Flaherty becomes an environmental lobbyist in Washington D.C., he meets a "conservative junior senator named Alex P. Keaton." Meredith Baxter also portrayed Mike Flaherty's mother, Macy Flaherty, in the episodes "Family Affair" (Parts 1 and 2).

The main cast of Family Ties (minus a few other recurring cast members) has reunited publicly on three occasions (along with series creator/producer Gary David Goldberg on two occasions). They first reunited on February 7, 2008 (minus Tracy Pollan, Scott Valentine, Marc Price, Brian Bonsall and Courteney Cox) for an interview on The Today Show to help promote Goldberg's memoir Sit, Ubu, Sit. The cast reunited again (minus Valentine, Bonsall and Cox) for a second time for the 2011 TV Land Awards in March of that year, which included Pollan alongside her husband Fox.  That awards show would be the final appearance of Goldberg with the entire group. In October 2015, the main cast reunited for a third time with a second appearance (which included Pollan alongside Fox, but minus Price, Valentine, Bonsall and Cox) on The Today Show, and the first cast reunion since the 2013 death of Goldberg from cancer.

WandaVision
The 2021 Marvel Cinematic Universe series for the Disney+ video streaming service, references the series in the fifth episode, "On a Very Special Episode...," such as a stylized title sequence partially parodying the Family Ties opening that depicted the family first as a penciled sketch before finishing as a painted portrait, along with an upbeat theme song praising the family's love and closeness. In the episode, Wanda Maximoff and Vision are attempting to navigate raising their new children Tommy and Billy, both of whom are developing superhero abilities of their own.

References
 
 Goldberg, Gary David. "Comedy Stop: What Would Alex Keaton Do?." The New York Times, March 3, 2008.
 Haglund, David. "Reagan's Favorite Sitcom: How Family Ties spawned a conservative hero." Slate. March 2, 2007.
 Hurst, Alex. "Remembering an icon from the 'Me-Decade'." The Daily Pennsylvanian, April 24, 2001.
Patterson, Thomas. "What would Alex P. Keaton do?." CNN, November 1, 2006.
 Saenz, Michael. "Family Ties". - Museum of Broadcast Communications
 Stewart, Susan. "The Parents Ate Sprouts; the Kid Stole the Show." The New York Times'', February 25, 2007.

Notes

External links
 

1980s American sitcoms
1982 American television series debuts
1989 American television series endings
English-language television shows
NBC original programming
Primetime Emmy Award-winning television series
Television series about families
Television series by CBS Studios
Television shows set in Columbus, Ohio
Television series by Ubu Productions
Television series created by Gary David Goldberg